Darling Downs is an outer southeastern suburb of Perth, Western Australia, within the Shire of Serpentine-Jarrahdale. The name, referring to the suburb's proximity to the Darling Scarp, was first used as an estate name in 1977, and adopted as a suburb name in 1997.

History

Most of the area now known as 'Darling Downs' was historically known as 'Wongong' (later 'Wungong'), but the westernmost portion through which Hopkinson Road passes from the 1930s onwards was regarded as part of the Peel Estate in the Group Settlement Scheme.

Schools
Darling Downs has no schools inside of it but there are some schools in Byford, Forrestdale, Hammond Park, Armadale,  
Schools In Byford: West Byford Primary School, Marri Grove Primary School, Byford Secondary School, Salvado Catholic College
School In Forrestdale: Carey Baptist College Forrestdale
School In Hammond Park: Hammond Park Secondary College
Schools In Armadale: Dale Christian School, Neerigen Brook Primary School, John Calvin Christian College, Pioneer Village School, Armadale Education Support Centre.

Facilities

Since the 1990s, Darling Downs has been in transformation from a rural area mostly comprising hobby farms and a small number of larger land holdings to an outer suburban area of quality housing stock on generous residential lots.  As yet there are no commercial facilities in the area.  Established community facilities are:
 Rowley Brook Village (an aged persons village).
 Darling Downs Free Reformed Church.

References

External links

Suburbs of Perth, Western Australia
Shire of Serpentine-Jarrahdale